Hannu Kuru (born 12 May 1993) is a Finnish ice hockey player who currently playing for MHk 32 Liptovský Mikuláš of the Slovak Extraliga.

Kuru made his SM-liiga debut playing with HC TPS during the 2012–13 SM-liiga season.

Career statistics

Regular season and playoffs

References

External links
 

1993 births
Living people
Finnish ice hockey forwards
People from Kaarina
HC TPS players
TuTo players
Tappara players
Espoo Blues players
HK Spišská Nová Ves players
MHk 32 Liptovský Mikuláš players
Sportspeople from Southwest Finland
Finnish expatriate ice hockey players in Slovakia